Skhira is a coastal town in Sfax Governate, central-eastern Tunisia. It lies on the coast of the Gulf of Gabes. It has a large oil terminal for pipelines coming from the Tunisian and Algerian oilfields. The old village grew in the late nineteenth century as the centre of the export trade in esparto grass, used in the manufacture of paper.

Populated places in Sfax Governorate
Populated coastal places in Tunisia
Communes of Tunisia